Sinogastromyzon puliensis is a species of ray-finned fish in the family Balitoridae. It is endemic to Taiwan. 
It is found in the Kaoping, Tsengwen, Choshui, Tatu, and Tachia Rivers in the western half of the island. It prefers running waters at low to middle elevations.

See also
List of protected species in Taiwan
List of endemic species of Taiwan

Sources

Sinogastromyzon
Endemic fauna of Taiwan
Freshwater fish of Taiwan
Fish described in 1974
Taxonomy articles created by Polbot